is a Japanese actor.

Career
Sugimoto was first a member of a rock band before he debuted as an actor in 1983 in the film Hakujasho. For that film, he won a Japan Academy Prize best newcomer award. In addition to his work in film, he has also acted on television, stage, and in television commercials.

He has appeared in films such as Takeshi Kitano's Outrage and Junji Sakamoto's Strangers in the City.

Filmography

Film
 Hakujasho (1983)
 A Promise (1986)
 Zegen (1987)
 Sukeban Deka The Movie (1987)
 Hope and Pain (1988)
 Luminous Moss (1992)
 The River with No Bridge (1992)
 Tokyo Eyes (1998)
 Tokyo Rampage (1998)
 All About Lily Chou-Chou (2001)
 Waterboys (2001)
 Alive (2002)
 Samurai Resurrection (2003)
 Socrates in Love (2004)
 Reincarnation (2005)
 Pacchigi! Love & Peace (2007)
 Dororo (2007)
 Departures (2008)
 Ichi (2008)
 252 (2008)
 John Rabe (2009)
 I Give My First Love to You (2009)
 Zero Focus (2009)
 Outrage (2010)
 Strangers in the City (2010)
 Night People (2013)
 Still the Water (2014)
 Erased (2016)
 The 8-Year Engagement (2017), Mai's father
 The Memory Eraser (2020)
 From Today, It's My Turn!! The Movie (2020)
 Signal the Movie (2021)
 Fullmetal Alchemist: The Revenge of Scar (2022)
 Akira and Akira (2022)
 Shylock's Children (2023), Kazuo Furukawa
 The Village (2023), Maruoka
 Eternal New Mornings (2023)
 Hard Days (2023)

Television
 The Abe Clan (1995)
 Water Boys (2003)
 Dark Tales of Japan (2004)
 Haruka Seventeen (2005)
 Kurosagi (2006)
 Hanazakari no Kimitachi e (2007)
 Barefoot Gen (2007)
 Code Blue (2008)
 Ryōmaden (2010)
 My Dog, My Happiness (2011)
 Amachan (2013)
 The Emperor's Cook (2015)
 Naotora: The Lady Warlord (2017), Ii Naomori
 Idaten (2019), Dōmei Nagai
 Scams (2019)
 The Fugitive (2020), Mitsuhiko Miyajima
 Japan Sinks: People of Hope (2021), Shūya Naganuma
 Bakumatsu Aibō-den (2022), Nagai Naoyuki
 The 13 Lords of the Shogun (2022), Minamoto no Yukiie
 Teen Regime (2022), Masaki Sagawa

References

External links
 Official profile (in Japanese)
 

Japanese male actors
1965 births
Living people
People from Chigasaki, Kanagawa
Male actors from Kanagawa Prefecture